Chadpai Wildlife Sanctuary is a wildlife sanctuary located near Mongla in Bagerhat District of Bangladesh. It was officially declared as a wildlife sanctuary by the government of Bangladesh on 29 January 2012.

It is one of the safe zones for vultures as per the Vulture Safe Zone-2 Schedule of the government of Bangladesh in 2012. Chadpai wetland is one of the dolphin sanctuaries in Bangladesh.

On 9 December 2014 a tanker named OT Southern Star 7 carrying some 357,000 liters furnace oil collided with another vessel and spilled at Mrigmari of Chadpai Wildlife Sanctuary under East Zone of the Sundarbans.

See also
 List of wildlife sanctuaries of Bangladesh

References 

Wildlife sanctuaries of Bangladesh
Tourist attractions in Bangladesh